William Anderson (born c. 1860, deceased) was a Scottish international footballer who played as a right winger. He played club football for Queen's Park and appeared in the sides that won the Scottish Cup in 1881, 1882 and 1884, and finished as runners-up in the English FA Cup in 1884 and 1885.

He made his international debut for Scotland on 11 March 1882 and went on to play six matches in the next three years, scoring three goals. In his final appearance on 23 March 1885, he scored twice in an 8–1 win over Wales.

References

External links

Scottish footballers
Association football outside forwards
Scotland international footballers
Queen's Park F.C. players
1860s births
Year of death missing
Year of birth uncertain
Footballers from Glasgow
Place of death missing
FA Cup Final players